Margaret B. Blackman (born 1944) is an anthropologist known for her work with the Haida First Nation of Haida Gwaii in British Columbia, Canada, beginning in the 1970s.

She is, and has been for many years, a professor of anthropology at the State University of New York at Brockport.

Her best-known work is a collaborative biography of the Haida artist Florence Davidson, published in 1982.

Bibliography
 Blackman, Margaret B. (1982; rev. ed., 1992) During My Time: Florence Edenshaw Davidson, a Haida Woman.  Seattle: University of Washington Press.  
 Davidson, Robert, and Margaret B. Blackman (1992) Foreword.  Raven's Cry by Christie Harris.  Vancouver: Douglas & McIntyre.

American anthropologists
American women anthropologists
American biographers
American women biographers
Anthropology educators
State University of New York faculty
1944 births
Living people
American women academics
21st-century American women